Eduardo Pedro Ithurbide (10 March 1908 – unknown) was a Uruguayan footballer who played for the Uruguay national football team. He also represented the France national football B team in 1938.

Career statistics

International

International goals
Scores and results list Uruguay's goal tally first.

References

1908 births
Date of death unknown
Uruguayan footballers
French footballers
Footballers from Montevideo
Uruguayan expatriate footballers
Uruguay international footballers
Association football forwards
Montevideo Wanderers F.C. players
Club Nacional de Football players
FC Sochaux-Montbéliard players
Club Atlético Platense footballers
Expatriate footballers in Argentina
Uruguayan expatriate sportspeople in Argentina
French expatriate sportspeople in Argentina